Illies can refer to:

C. Illies & Co., German company
Illies, Nord, a commune in the Nord department in northern France
Henning Illies, a German geologist